Phineas and Ferb the Movie: Across the 2nd Dimension is a 2011 American animated science fantasy action-adventure television film based on the American animated TV series Phineas and Ferb. The film premiered on August 5, 2011 in the United States. It was first announced by Jeff "Swampy" Marsh during a January 2010 interview with the Daily Telegraph. The events of the film take place during the third season of Phineas and Ferb. It is the first feature-length film of the Phineas and Ferb series, and the third animated Disney Channel Original Movie, following Kim Possible Movie: So the Drama and The Proud Family Movie.

The film premiere averaged 7.6 million viewers, making it one of the highest-rated animated programs on cable in more than three years. It later gained over 3 million viewers to become the second most watched animated basic cable telecast ever among kids 6–11 and teens 9–14, and cable's fifth highest viewership movie ever in total viewers.

It is the first film based on the series. A standalone sequel called Phineas and Ferb the Movie: Candace Against the Universe was released on August 28, 2020 on Disney+.

Plot
Phineas and Ferb start another summer day playing with Perry and are inspired by him to create an enormous shuttlecock to play platypult (platypus + catapult) badminton. Perry enters his secret lair and is warned by Major Monogram that he's had some close calls with his "host family" (the Flynn-Fletchers) almost seeing him enter his lair. He then reminds Perry that if his cover's blown, he'll have to be relocated to another city, with another host family and that he'll never see Phineas and Ferb again and also reveals that Perry has an auto-scan replication device in his hat which he has used to scan and replicate all of Doofenshmirtz's "inators" to determine whether Doofenshmirtz is getting smarter or not. 

Perry leaves the lair in a hovercraft, but accidentally collides with the boys' shuttlecock while both are in flight, sending them off course. Doofenshmirtz begins his plan with his "Other-Dimension-inator", intended to create portals to parallel dimensions, but it fails to function and Phineas and Ferb crash into it a few moments later. Meanwhile, Candice, feeling she is immature, decides to act more like an adult and use this mindset to bust the boys herself. However, she discovers that the boy's invention has disappeared and concludes the same "mysterious force" she believes keeps the boys from being busted is working against her now, and tries to find the source of it.

Phineas and Ferb assist Doofenshmirtz (oblivious that he is evil) in repairing the machine and build a remote that allows them to use the portals anywhere. Perry arrives to stop Doofenshmirtz, but not wanting to reveal his identity and put Phineas and Ferb in danger, reverts to pet mode and fails to stop them. Doofenshmirtz, Phineas, Ferb, and Perry travel to a parallel dimension, where an alternate version of Doofenshmirtz has successfully conquered the Tri-State Area with an army of robots and installed himself as dictator. 
Doofenshmirtz meets his counterpart, Doofenshmirtz-2, who has also converted Perry-2 into a Platyborg (platypus cyborg), who now serves as his second-in-command. Recognizing Perry as a secret agent, Doofenshmirtz-2 forces Perry to reveal his secret identity by having Platyborg attack them, much to the boys' shock. They escape, but Phineas is angry with Perry for his deception. Doofenshmirtz-2 explains to Doofenshmirtz that he was driven to evil because he lost a toy train as a child, enraging Doofenshmirtz as his backstory is much more tragic and yet he still hasn't accomplished anything. 

When the boys try to use the remote to return home, they discover they can't open a portal back to their own dimension and seek out their parallel-dimension selves, while Doofenshmirtz-2 plans to use another Other-Dimension-Inator reconstructed by Doofenshmirtz to invade the first Tri-State area and annex it into his regime. The boys meet their counterparts, who have been oppressed under Doofenshmirtz-2's rule, and introduce them to the concept of Summer. When Doofenshmirtz-2 makes a public announcement that he will spare Phineas and Ferb if Perry surrenders himself, Perry agrees to the deal, but before he leaves is told by an angry Phineas that he is no longer their pet. When Doofenshmirtz-2 learns that the boys had made some modifications to the Other-Dimension-inator that helped it to function, he reneges on the deal. 

Phineas, Ferb, and their counterparts ask the alternate Isabella for help and find that she, as well as the alternate Baljeet and Buford, are part of an underground resistance organization led by the alternate Candace. Baljeet-2 explains that it takes a large amount of energy to open against the flow of dimensions, but he is able to open a highly unstable portal backwards into the first dimension. Upon learning about Perry's capture, Phineas and Ferb decide to rescue Perry before they can leave. In the first dimension, Candace spots the portal and, believing it to be the mysterious force, jumps through, causing it to collapse. The kids catch Candace up to speed and set off to rescue Perry, but are captured by Doofenshmirtz-2 and his forces. 

Perry distracts Doofenshmirtz-2 with a video call of Monogram in the shower, allowing the boys to escape in minecarts through a tunnel. Platyborg attacks and damages one of the carts, slowing them down. Unwilling to endanger her own brothers, Candace-2 escapes with Phineas-2 and Ferb-2, but abandons Phineas, Ferb, Candace, and Perry, who are subsequently captured by Doofenshmirtz-2. The boys refuse to fix the machine, but inadvertently remind Doofenshmirtz how they fixed the machine by removing the self-destruct button. 

After Doofenshmirtz powers up the machine, Doofenshmirtz-2 orders Phineas, Ferb, Candace, and Perry to be fed to a monster called the Goozim; when Doofenshmirtz annoys him again, Doofenshmirtz-2 orders his execution as well. Before the five can be eaten, Candace-2 rescues them and gives them the remote, allowing Phineas, Ferb, Candace, Perry, and Doofenshmirtz to escape to yet another dimension, but Candace-2 herself is captured and imprisoned. Doofenshmirtz-2 invades the first dimension with an army of robots. 

Meanwhile, Phineas, Ferb, Candace, Perry, and Doofenshmirtz, having traveled through a cyclic path of many dimensions, arrive back in the first dimension. Perry gives Phineas and Ferb the locket off his collar, which is a key that leads them to Perry's lair. Inside, they find out that Perry had scanned and replicated all their previous inventions. With the help of their friends, the children of Danville, and the O.W.C.A. agents, Phineas and Ferb use the inventions to fight Doofenshmirtz-2's robot invasion, while Candace-2 is freed from prison by Phineas-2, Ferb-2, and Jeremy-2. Phineas and Perry climb to the top of Doofenshmritz's building to shut down the invasion where Perry defeats Platyborg by shoving his spiked tail into a power outlet, electrocuting him. Phineas manages to destroy the satellite controlling the robots, disabling Doofenshmirtz-2's entire army. Meanwhile, Candace, who has given up on becoming an adult early after seeing how miserable it made her alternate self become, races to show her parents (who are watching a movie and believe the invasion is just 3-D effects) the invasion in order to use the mysterious force to her advantage.

Doofenshmirtz-2 tries to destroy Perry, Phineas and Ferb in revenge for foiling his invasion with a giant robot, but Doofenshmirtz arrives and gives Doofenshmirtz-2 his own toy train (since he never lost it), resolving his tragic backstory. Doofenshmirtz-2 stands down his invasion and destroys the remains of his robot army with a self-destruct button just in time for Candace to fail to bust her brothers, much to her joy for once. Doofenshmirtz-2 is arrested when he returns home and several characters from the other dimension arrive in the original dimension to thank their counterparts for saving the day before returning.

Platyborg's electrocution reverts him to his normal self and Phineas-2 and Ferb-2 take him home and Candace advises her counterpart to pursue a relationship with Jeremy-2 before she leaves. The kids are distraught to learn that Perry will be relocated since his cover is blown, but Carl uses Doofenshmirtz's Amnesia-inator to erase their memories so they can keep Perry, though Doofenshmirtz has his memories erased by force. Before they forget, Phineas and Ferb say their goodbyes to Perry, and Isabella takes the moment to kiss Phineas just before their memories are erased. Later, Perry enters his lair and uploads photos of the events.

Cast

Music

The soundtrack of the movie Phineas and Ferb: Across the 1st and 2nd Dimensions includes 8 songs from the movie and 14 songs from the series, released on August 2. Guns N' Roses guitarist Slash co-wrote and performed in a song for the soundtrack titled "Kick It Up a Notch". The song "I Walk Away" is not included in the soundtrack. A song cut from the film, "Mysterious Force", is included.

Walmart sells a version of the soundtrack with 10 extra songs.

Songs
Original songs performed in the film include:

Deleted scenes
The DVD release includes 8 deleted scenes that were fully completed but cut due to time.

Deleted scenes include:

 Mysterious Force: Extended scene and included a song that was also cut from the final movie.
 Pretendy the Practicepus (Extended): Extended scene where Doofenshmirtz practices his speech with a toy Perry that includes a scene with Vanessa who doesn't appear in the final movie
 2nd Dimension Vanessa: Vanessa 2 (who doesn't appear in the final movie) argues with her Dad over him constantly banishing any boy that talks to her
 2nd Dimension Flyover: The main characters ride in a blimp to the doom temple
 News Report: A News Report explaining the incoming Doofenshmirtz 2 invasion.
 Perry's Lair (Extended): Extended scene from when the boys find Perry's lair
 Kick It Up a Notch (Extended): Extended scene from the final fight scene
 Ending Scene (Extended): Extended scene of the characters getting their memory wiped. Has a gag where they need to redo the memory wipe after they see Perry in his Agent-P persona

Release

Disney Channel
The movie premiered on August 5, 2011 in Canada and Hong Kong, on August 27, 2011 in Singapore, the Philippines, and Malaysia, on September 25, 2011 in India, on September 30, 2011 in the United Kingdom, Ireland, Australia, and New Zealand, and on November 5, 2011 in South Africa.

Disney XD
The movie premiered on August 20, 2011 in Canada, on October 2, 2011 in India, and on October 6, 2011 in the United Kingdom and Ireland.

Theatrical release
Only in Spain, the movie premiered on theatres on August 31, 2011.

Home media
The movie, presented in widescreen, was released on DVD on August 23, 2011. It includes 8 deleted scenes, interactive menus with easter eggs, an "'Animation'" music video, a "Perry-oke" sing along feature, "Dr. D's Jukebox-inator", "Prance Askance Execution", and the episode "Attack of the 50 Foot Sister" with character and creator commentary. The digital copy also bundled includes the film and 8 digital music tracks. For a limited time, a free In-Pack Platypult Kit was included with the set. Toys R Us sells a version of the DVD with a bonus disc containing the Season 3 episodes "Ask a Foolish Question" and "Misperceived Monotreme."

As well, a change is made to the credits of the movie: the full version of "Takin' Care of Things" is heard, replacing "Kick It Up a Notch", and instead of the background being black, it features a dark blue background with several triangles. This edit was also in the television premieres of the film in some countries. 
The film was released in the UK on March 5, 2012, with the same bonus features, as well as the bonus episode "Attack of the 50 Foot Sister". As of November 12, 2019, the film, along with the series, have been available to stream on Disney+ and used the original broadcast version instead of the edited version on DVD.

Video games

Console game

A video game based on the movie was released. In it, players assume the role of Phineas, Ferb, their 2nd Dimension forms, as well as Agent P and a character exclusive to the game, Agent T,  as they travel through worlds. The characters use gadgets such as baseball launchers and Carbonators (soda blasters) to defeat enemies. Scenes from the movie are present in the game. The game was released on August 2, 2011 for PlayStation 3, Wii, PlayStation Portable and Nintendo DS. The PS3 version also has four episodes of the show in Blu-ray format as a bonus feature.

Online game
A separate online game titled Phineas and Ferb The Movie Game: The Dimension of Doooom! was released when the website for Across the 2nd Dimension was launched. The game plays very similar to its predecessor, Transport-inators of Doooom!, of which it even shares its name with.

In the game, the player plays as Phineas, Ferb, Agent P, or the Candace of the 2nd Dimension (and after the game is beaten, the Phineas and Ferb of the 2nd Dimension as well). Each character has a glider to help get/fly through the air, and a ray gun to defeat nearby enemies and break boxes. The start and end of most levels have full-voiced cutscenes, however, they do not follow the storyline of the actual film, but rather one all its own. In game, Isabella and Baljeet of the 2nd Dimension appear to give the player guidelines. Dr. Doofenshmirtz of the 2nd Dimension also appears to taunt the player.

Reception

Critical reception
On the review aggregation website Rotten Tomatoes, the film has an approval rating of 100% based on 5 reviews.

Matt Blum of the Wired.com website claims that "this is truly an instant classic, right up there with some of the best cartoons ever made".

Los Angeles Times television critic Robert Lloyd enjoyed Phineas and Ferb: Across the 2nd Dimension as well, noting "a hint of emotional depth, regarding the love between animals and the people who live with them". Both reviewers highlighted the film's employment of adult-oriented humor that makes it equally enjoyable for viewers of all ages.

Noel Murray of The A.V. Club gave it a B+. Murray said that the action theme of the movie was a deviation of what the series does best, but that the movie still had enough to satisfy its fans, including a charming dialogue.

Ratings
Phineas and Ferb the Movie: Across the 2nd Dimension averaged 7.6 million viewers, the film soared to become TV's #1 scripted telecast of 2011 to date among Kids 6–11 (3.4 million/13.8 rating), TV's #1 movie among 'Tweens' 9–14 (2.6 million/10.8 rating) and cable's #1 movie of the year in Total Viewers.

Moreover, the film ranked as cable's #1 animated telecast in more than 3 years among Kids 6–11 and 'Tweens' 9–14 (since 2/18/08 – "Fairly OddBaby"), and ranks #4 among all animated cable telecasts in the 'Tween' demo.

In Australia, the movie had 122,000 viewers and in the United Kingdom, there were 533,000 viewers. In Canada, the film delivered 915,000 viewers on Family Channel.

Box office
Phineas and Ferb the Movie: Across the 2nd Dimension was released theatrically in Spain, being the third Disney Channel series to be released in theaters after Hannah Montana and Lizzie McGuire. On its opening weekend, the film grossed $1,259,632 with an average of $4,467 from 282 theaters, earning the #4 spot in the country. The film lost 49% of its gross on its second weekend, earning $646,145. The movie has grossed $5,689,121 in Spain as of December 11.

Television follow-up
A 22-minute episode titled "Tales From the Resistance: Back to the 2nd Dimension" was produced for the fourth season of the television series. It aired in November 25, 2014 on Disney XD and January 9, 2015 on Disney Channel. In addition to this, Emmy-Award-winning actress and recurring guest star Allison Janney voiced 2nd Charlene, the 'ex-wife' of Doofenshmirtz-2.

Stand-alone sequel
On April 11, 2019, it was announced that a second film titled Phineas and Ferb the Movie: Candace Against the Universe, would be released on Disney+ within a year of its launch. Most of the series cast reprised their roles, with the exception being Thomas Sangster as Ferb, who is replaced by David Errigo Jr., who previously voiced the character in Milo Murphy's Law. It was released on August 28, 2020.

"If I had a nickel" meme 
The scene in which Doofenshmirtz remarks "Wow, if I had a nickel for every time I was doomed by a puppet, I'd have two nickels... which isn't a lot, but it's weird that it happened twice, right?", after Doofenshmirtz-2 orders his execution, has been memed by fans.

References

External links

2010s American animated films
2011 animated films
2011 television films
2011 films
American animated television films
American science fiction television films
American children's animated action films
American children's animated adventure films
American children's animated comic science fiction films
American children's animated science fantasy films
American children's animated musical films
American musical comedy films
Animated films about children
Animated films based on animated series
2010s English-language films
Disney Channel Original Movie films
Disney direct-to-video animated films
American dystopian films
Films about parallel universes
Across the 2nd Dimension
American flash animated films
2010s children's animated films
Disney Television Animation films

he:פיניאס ופרב#פיניאס ופרב - הסרט - המסע אל היקום המקביל